Statistics of National Association Foot Ball League in season 1918/1919.

League standings
                                  GP   W   L   T  GF  GA Pts
 Bethlehem Steel         10   9   1   0  37   4  19
 Philadelphia Merchant Ship   10   4   3   3  19  14  11
 Paterson F.C.                10   5   1   4  19  17  11
 Brooklyn Robins Dry Dock     10   3   2   5  17  20   8
 New York F.C.                10   2   3   5  13  21   7
 Bayonne Babcock & Wilcox     10   1   2   7  14  33   4

References
NATIONAL ASSOCIATION FOOT BALL LEAGUE (RSSSF)

1918-19
1918–19 domestic association football leagues
1918–19 in American soccer